Barry J. Farber is an American entrepreneur, sales consultant, author, and talk show host.

Career
Farber has written eleven books, which have been translated into more than 25 languages with over one million copies sold.  He is a monthly columnist for a while Entrepreneur magazine, and formerly hosted a television show called Diamonds in the Rough, and is current executive producer for the Jackie Mason Show, for which work he won 3 Telly Awards.

He was the broker and agent for the $7 million Evel Knievel roller coaster that Six Flags Theme Parks launched the summer of 2008, and is literary agent for the autobiography of world champion skateboarder Andy Macdonald.

He holds a black belt in Tae Kwon Do, Black Belt Weapons Regional and National Tournament Champion  and studies several other martial arts. Farber often incorporates his martial arts experience into his presentations.

Farber is Co-Inventor and Marketer of the FoldzFlat Pen.

Influence
Farber's perspectives have been quoted in other publications, such as If it wasn't for the people—this job would be fun! by Charles Bourke Motsett,  
Secrets of Successful Telephone Selling, by Robert W. Bly,  
The Aladdin factor by Jack Canfield, Mark Victor Hansen, 
and How You Can Start and Manage Your Own Business by Nathaniel Ejiga.

Partial bibliography
Barry Farber's Guide to Handling Sales Objections 
Superstar Sales Manager's Secrets 
Superstar Sales Secrets: State of the Art Selling 
Diamond Power: Gems of Wisdom from America's Greatest Marketer 
Superstar Sales Secrets 
State of the Art Selling 
Breakthrough Selling: Customer-building Strategies from the Best in the Business (with Joyce Wycoff) 
Diamond in the Rough 
Dive Right in: 101 Powerful Action Steps for Personal Achievement 
Sales Secrets from Your Customers 
Diamonds Under Pressure: Five Steps to Turning Adversity Into Success

References

External links
 Barry J. Farber website

American male writers
American television talk show hosts
Living people
Place of birth missing (living people)
Year of birth missing (living people)